Promenade Gardens is a garden in Georgetown, Guyana. 

The park is separated from the gardens by Middle Street.

The park is bound by Carmichael Street to the west, across from which is the State House (president's residence).

The other public garden in Georgetown is the larger Botanical Gardens farther from city centre. There is also the modern National Park in the north of the city.

References 

Gardens in Guyana